Mulmur is a township in Dufferin County in Southern Ontario, Canada. There are a number of original settlements such as Mulmur Corners, some of which can still be identified as to location, including Rosemont and Stanton.

Communities
The township of Mulmur comprises a number of villages and hamlets, including Airlie (partially), Banda (partially), Black Bank, Earnscliffe, Happy Valley, Honeywood, Kilgorie, Lavender (partially), Mansfield, Mulmur, Mulmur Corners (partially), Perm, Ponton Mills, Randwick, Rookery Creek, Rosemont (partially), Ruskview, Scarlet Hill, Slabtown, Stanton, Terra Nova, Violet Hill (partially), Whitfield, Conover, Henderson's Corners (partially), Hipson's Corners. Boyne Mill, Hall's Corners, Old Egypt, Primrose (partially).

Demographics 

Climate

See also
List of townships in Ontario

References

External links

Township of Mulmur

Lower-tier municipalities in Ontario
Municipalities in Dufferin County
Township municipalities in Ontario